Omoglymmius cupedoides is a species of beetle in the subfamily Rhysodinae. It was described by R.T. Bell & J.R. Bell in 1993. It is known from Madang, Papua New Guinea, where it was collected in 1896.

Omoglymmius cupedoides measure  in length.

References

cupedoides
Beetles of Papua New Guinea
Endemic fauna of Papua New Guinea
Insects of New Guinea
Endemic fauna of New Guinea
Beetles described in 1993